Khavaran District is in Ray County, Tehran province, Iran. At the 2011 National Census, its population was 47,811 people in 13,023 households. At the latest census in 2016, the district had 46,765 inhabitants in 13,455 households.

References 

Ray County, Iran

Districts of Tehran Province

Populated places in Tehran Province

Populated places in Ray County, Iran

fa:بخش خاوران